In enzymology, a purine nucleosidase is an enzyme that catalyzes the chemical reaction

a purine nucleoside + H2O  D-ribose + a purine base

Thus, the two substrates of this enzyme are purine nucleoside and H2O, whereas its two products are D-ribose and purine base.

This enzyme belongs to the family of hydrolases, specifically those glycosylases that hydrolyse N-glycosyl compounds.  The systematic name of this enzyme class is purine-nucleoside ribohydrolase. Other names in common use include nucleosidase, purine beta-ribosidase, purine nucleoside hydrolase, purine ribonucleosidase, ribonucleoside hydrolase, nucleoside hydrolase, N-ribosyl purine ribohydrolase, nucleosidase g, N-D-ribosylpurine ribohydrolase, inosine-adenosine-guanosine preferring nucleoside hydrolase, purine-specific nucleoside N-ribohydrolase, IAG-nucleoside hydrolase, and IAG-NH.  This enzyme participates in purine metabolism and nicotinate and nicotinamide metabolism.

Structural studies

References

 
 
 
 
 
 
 
 

EC 3.2.2
Enzymes of known structure